Just for the Record was Ray Stevens' thirteenth studio album and his first for Warner Bros. Records, released in 1976. For this album, Stevens specializes particularly in the music genre of country. Joe Cocker's hit "You Are So Beautiful" is the only cover song on the album. "You Are So Beautiful" and "Honky Tonk Waltz" are two singles lifted from the album.

Track listing

Album credits
Arranged and Produced by: Ray Stevens
Recorded at Ray Stevens Sound Laboratory, Nashville
Engineer: Tom Knox
Art Direction, Photography by: Ed Thrasher

Charts
Album - Billboard (North America)

Singles - Billboard (North America)

References

1976 albums
Ray Stevens albums
Warner Records albums